The Minnesota Swarm are a lacrosse team based in Minnesota playing in the National Lacrosse League (NLL). The 2009 season was the 5th in franchise history.

The Swarm played their first four seasons in the East division, but because of the addition of the Boston Blazers and the demise of the Arizona Sting, they were moved to the West division for the 2009 season.

Regular season

Conference standings

Game log
Reference:

Player stats
Reference:

Runners (Top 10)

Note: GP = Games played; G = Goals; A = Assists; Pts = Points; LB = Loose balls; PIM = Penalty minutes

Goaltenders
Note: GP = Games played; MIN = Minutes; W = Wins; L = Losses; GA = Goals against; Sv% = Save percentage; GAA = Goals against average

Transactions

Players not returning
 Andrew Biers - traded
 Chris Courtney - traded
 Chris McKay - traded

Trades

Entry draft
The 2008 NLL Entry Draft took place on September 7, 2008. The Swarm selected the following players:

Roster

See also
2009 NLL season

References

Minnesota
2009 in sports in Minnesota